Maowid ala Ashaa is a 1981 Egyptian romance film starring Soad Hosni and Ahmed Zaki. The life story of a beautiful and pure woman, interested of the very little things with a great sensibility.

Cast
 Souad Hosni as Nawal
 Ahmed Zaki as Shoukry
 Hussein Fahmy as Asad
 Zouzou Madi

Plot
This movie revolves around the story of an innocent girl (Nawal) who was married to a rich and possessive man who still wants her back after their divorce; however she meets a hair stylist (Shoukry) and falls in love with him. They get married but her first husband starts torturing Shoukry so he can leave Nawal but he refuses. Eventually, he is murdered by her first husband. So Nawal arranges a dinner date with her ex-husband telling him that she wants to get back to him and after they finish eating dinner, she tells him that she had put poison food and that both of them don't deserve to live after the death of the love of her life, Shoukry.

Award
1981: Best Actress, Souad Hosni, by Egyptian Film Association. Egypt.

See also
 Egyptian films of the 1980s
 List of Egyptian films of 1981

References
 “Cinematechhaddad”, 
 " Maowid ala ashaa”, (“A Dinner Date”),(موعد على العشاء)), (1981), 
 " Maowid ala ashaa”, 
 "سعاد حسني", :ar:سعاد حسني

1981 films
20th-century Egyptian films